Teodor Kabakchiev (born 16 March 1998) is a Bulgarian motorcycle rider who has won professional titles in enduro. He has won the FIM SuperEnduro World Championship in class Junior, the BMU European Championship; and the Bulgarian Enduro Championship several times.

Born in Gabrovo, Bulgaria, Teodor received his first bike at the age of 4 as a present for his birthday. He started racing from a very young age and pursued an international racing career.

He is the first ever Bulgarian in any motorcycle sport to win a World Championship.

Racing career

Bulgarian National Championship

International races

World Championship Races

External links
 Official 2022 FIM Hard Enduro World Championship Results 
 Official FIM Superenduro World Championship website
 FIM Superenduro World Championship website
 FIM Superenduro World Championship website
 Enduro 21 website
 Official FIM website Kabakchiev crowned World Champion
 Superenduro Championship results
 Bulgarian Motorcycle Federation official website
 Balkan Motorcycle Union official website

References

Enduro riders
People from Gabrovo
Off-road motorcycle racers
1998 births
Living people